Brocklebank Dock was a railway station on the Liverpool Overhead Railway, adjacent to the dock of the same name. It became particularly busy after Langton Dock station was closed in 1906, with workers of the Langton Dock using it instead.

It was opened on 6 March 1893 by the Marquis of Salisbury.

The station closed, along with the rest of the line on 30 December 1956. No evidence of this station remains.

References

External links
 Brocklebank Dock station on Subterranea Britannica

Disused railway stations in the Metropolitan Borough of Sefton
Former Liverpool Overhead Railway stations
Railway stations in Great Britain opened in 1893
Railway stations in Great Britain closed in 1956
1893 establishments in England
1956 disestablishments in England